Boca Norte is a Spanish drama streaming television series created by Eva Mor for Playz. Produced by RTVE in collaboration with Lavinia Audiovisual and directed by Dani de la Orden and Elena Trapé, it stars Begoña Vargas, David Solans, Marina Castro, Guillermo Lasheras, Jasmine Roldán, Júlia Creus and Guillermo Campra. It was released in January 2019.

Premise 
Set in Barcelona, the fiction tracks Andrea, a well-off girl who have just arrived to a poor neighborhood. Upon her arrival, she is forced by her father to join a cultural centre, "Boca Norte", where she meets new people with a penchant for trap music and dance. It deals with themes such as bisexuality and the dependence on social media.

Cast

Production and release 
Created by Eva Mor, the series was produced by RTVE in collaboration with Lavinia Audiovisual for RTVE's streaming platform Playz. The screenplay was written by Eva Baeza together with Miguel Ibáñez, whereas the episodes were directed by Dani de la Orden and Elena Trapé. Eugenio Saavedra, Carlos Mochales and Agustín Alonso were credited as executive producers on behalf of RTVE whereas Rubén Mayoral was credited as executive producer on behalf of Lavinia Audiovisual. Shooting began in July 2018 in Barcelona. In November 2018, the series was pre-screened at the Zoom Festival in Igualada. Playz released the 6-episode season on 23 January 2019.

Awards 

|-
| align = "center" | 2019 || 66th Ondas Awards || colspan = "2" | Best Streaming Content ||  || 
|}

References

External links 
 Boca Norte on RTVE Play

2019 Spanish television series debuts
2019 Spanish television series endings
Spanish teen drama television series
2010s Spanish drama television series
Playz original programming
2010s teen drama television series
Television series about teenagers
Television shows set in Barcelona
Spanish-language television shows
Television shows filmed in Spain